Tasman Keith is an Australian rapper and singer-songwriter.

Early life
Tasman Keith is a Gumbaynggirr man from Bowraville, New South Wales.

At age seven, Tasman and his family moved from Bowraville to Sydney for his father's music. His dad was a rapper called Wire MC. Tasman says he was on stage at eight years old at festivals. At age 14, his family decided to move back to Bowraville.

Career

2016-2020: Career beginnings and early EPs 
In 2016, Keith uploaded his music onto Triple J Unearthed.

In 2017, Keith released his debut studio single "Might Snap" which received rotation across several community radio platforms including FBi Radio and received critical acclaim on Triple J Unearthed. Shortly after, Keith teamed up with producer James Mangohig and Bad Apples Music's Nooky to begin the process of compiling his debut studio EP.

In 2018, Keith released his debut EP, Mission Famous which was recorded at Skinnyfish Music's Studio G and produced by Mangohig and Nooky. The EP made Triple J's Al Newstead's list of Best New Music for the week of 29 October 2018, calling the title track "the highlight".

In 2019, Keith collaborated with Stevie Jean and recorded the EP Evenings.

In November 2019, Keith released "Billy Bad Again", a song he says came from a "semi-frustrating studio session" with my producers, Kapital J & James Mangohig. Keith said "I was too focused on forcing out as many songs as I could. James had me step outside for a minute, when I came back in Kapital J had this beat that he said was perfect for the vibe we were in. It was this aggressive yet braggadocious instrumental that reminded me to have fun with it and talk my shit. 'Billy Bad Again' is the side of me that is confident and unapologetic, it's about being that guy wherever you are and for me it's my turn to show that through my music, whilst throwing in two Adam Sandler movie references." At the J Awards of 2020, the video won Australian Video of the year.

In December 2020, Keith released the EP To Whom It May Concern.

2021-present: A Colour Undone
In February 2022, Keith announced the forthcoming release of his debut studio album, A Colour Undone alongside its second single "Love Too Soon". A Colour Undone debuted at number 718 on the ARIA Charts.

Discography

Studio albums

Extended plays

Singles

As lead artist

As featured artist

Awards and nominations

AIR Awards
The Australian Independent Record Awards (known informally as the AIR Awards) is an annual awards night to recognise, promote and celebrate the success of Australia's Independent Music sector.

|-
| 2019
| Mission Famous
| Best Independent Hip Hop Album or EP
| 
|-
| 2020
| Evenings (with Stevie Jean)
| Best Independent Hip Hop Album or EP
| 
|-

APRA Awards
The APRA Awards are held in Australia and New Zealand by the Australasian Performing Right Association to recognise songwriting skills, sales and airplay performance by its members annually

|-
| 2022
| "First Nation" (Midnight Oil featuring Jessica Mauboy and Tasman Keith)
| Song of the Year
| 
|-

ARIA Music Awards
The ARIA Music Awards is an annual awards ceremony that recognises excellence, innovation, and achievement across all genres of the music of Australia. 

! 
|-
| 2022
| Seshanka Samarajiwa, Zain Ayub & Tasman Keith for Tasman Keith – A Colour Undone
| ARIA Award for Best Cover Art
| 
| 
|-

Australian Music Prize
The Australian Music Prize (the AMP) is an annual award of $30,000 given to an Australian band or solo artist in recognition of the merit of an album released during the year of award. It exists to discover, reward and promote new Australian music of excellence.

!  
|-
| 2022
| A Colour Undone
| Australian Music Prize
| 
| 
|-

J Awards
The J Awards are an annual series of Australian music awards that were established by the Australian Broadcasting Corporation's youth-focused radio station Triple J. They commenced in 2005.

|-
| J Awards of 2020
| "Billy Bad Again" (directed by Joey Hunter)
| Australian Video of the Year
| 
|-

National Indigenous Music Awards
The National Indigenous Music Awards (NIMA) recognise excellence, dedication, innovation and outstanding contribution to the Northern Territory music industry.

|-
| rowspan="3"| 2019
| himself
| New Talent of the Year
| 
|-
| rowspan="2"| "Prey" (with Stevie Jean)
| Song of the Year
| 
|-
| Film Clip of the Year
| 
|-
| 2020
| "Billy Bad Again"
| Film Clip of the Year
| 
|-
| rowspan="1"| 2022
| "Love Too Soon"
| Film Clip of the Year
| 
|-

References

Australian male rappers
Indigenous Australian musicians
Living people
1996 births